Terry Brent Rooker Jr. (born November 1, 1994) is an American professional baseball outfielder and first baseman for the Oakland Athletics of Major League Baseball (MLB). He made his MLB debut in 2020 with the Minnesota Twins and has also played for the San Diego Padres and Kansas City Royals.

Amateur career
Rooker attended Evangelical Christian School in Memphis, Tennessee, and enrolled at Mississippi State University to play college baseball for the Mississippi State Bulldogs. Rooker redshirted for the 2014 season. He played in 34 games in 2015, hitting .257/.325/.378 with two home runs and 12 runs batted in (RBIs). In 2016, he helped lead the Bulldogs to an Southeastern Conference (SEC) championship, hitting .324/.376/.578 with 11 home runs and 54 RBIs. In 2016, he played collegiate summer baseball with the Brewster Whitecaps of the Cape Cod Baseball League, and was named a league all-star.

In 2017, Rooker was named Collegiate Baseball national Player of the Year and SEC Player of the Year after leading the conference with a .387 batting average, 23 home runs, and 82 RBIs, winning only the second triple crown in SEC history, along with a .495 on base percentage, .810 slugging percentage, 30 doubles, and 18 stolen bases. He also won the C Spire Ferriss Trophy, given to Mississippi's top college baseball player.

Professional career

Minnesota Twins
The Minnesota Twins selected Rooker with the 35th overall selection of the 2017 Major League Baseball (MLB) draft. He signed with the Twins for a $1.935 million signing bonus. Rooker was assigned to the Elizabethton Twins and was later promoted to the Fort Myers Miracle. In 62 games between both clubs, he batted .281/.364/.566 with 18 home runs, 52 RBIs, and a .930 OPS.

He spent 2018 with the Chattanooga Lookouts. He batted .254/.333/.465 with 22 home runs (2nd in the Southern League), 79 RBIs (leading the league), 32 doubles (tied for the league lead), and 150 strikeouts (4th) in 130 games.

He spent 2019 with the Rochester Red Wings, earning International League All-Star honors. Over 65 games, he hit .281/.398/.535 with 14 home runs and 47 RBIs. After the season, on October 10, he was selected for the United States national baseball team in the 2019 WBSC Premier 12. In the tournament he batted .300/.333/.800	with three home runs and five RBIs in 20 at bats. He was named the best designated hitter in the tournament.

On September 4, 2020, Rooker was promoted to the major leagues for the first time and made his major league debut that day against the Detroit Tigers.

San Diego Padres
On April 7, 2022, the Twins traded Rooker, Taylor Rogers, and cash considerations to the San Diego Padres in exchange for Chris Paddack, Emilio Pagán, and a player to be named later.

Kansas City Royals
On August 2, 2022, the Padres traded Rooker to the Kansas City Royals in exchange for Cam Gallagher.

Oakland Athletics
On November 17, 2022, Rooker was claimed off outright waivers by the Oakland Athletics.

References

External links

Mississippi State Bulldogs bio

1996 births
Living people
All-American college baseball players
Baseball players from Tennessee
Brewster Whitecaps players
Chattanooga Lookouts players
Elizabethton Twins players
Fort Myers Miracle players
Gulf Coast Twins players
Kansas City Royals players
Major League Baseball first basemen
Major League Baseball outfielders
Minnesota Twins players
Mississippi State Bulldogs baseball players
People from Germantown, Tennessee
Rochester Red Wings players
San Diego Padres players
St. Paul Saints players
United States national baseball team players
2019 WBSC Premier12 players